Daniel Tihomirov Aleksandrov (born September 13, 1991) is a Bulgarian Greco-Roman wrestler. He competed in the men's Greco-Roman 75 kg event at the 2016 Summer Olympics, in which he was eliminated in the round of 16 by Péter Bácsi.

In March 2021, he competed at the European Qualification Tournament in Budapest, Hungary hoping to qualify for the 2020 Summer Olympics in Tokyo, Japan.

References

External links
 

1991 births
Living people
Bulgarian male sport wrestlers
Olympic wrestlers of Bulgaria
Wrestlers at the 2016 Summer Olympics
Wrestlers at the 2015 European Games
Wrestlers at the 2019 European Games
European Games medalists in wrestling
European Games bronze medalists for Bulgaria
European Wrestling Championships medalists
21st-century Bulgarian people